Bank of Carthage may refer to:

Bank of Carthage (Arkansas), historic business and building in Carthage, Arkansas
Bank of Carthage (Missouri), historic business in Carthage, Missouri
Citizens Bank (Carthage, Tennessee) in Carthage, Tennessee
Hometown Bank of Carthage in Carthage, Missouri